A tornado outbreak sequence, or tornado outbreak day sequence, sometimes referred to as an extended tornado outbreak, is a period of continuous or nearly continuous high tornado activity consisting of a series of tornado outbreaks over multiple days with no or very few days lacking tornado outbreaks.

Major tornado outbreak sequences occurred in the United States in May 1917, 1930, 1949, 1965, 1974, 2003, and 2011. Another exceptional outbreak sequence apparently occurred during mid to late May 1896. Although some days lacked tornado outbreaks, the period from mid to late April 2011 and late May 2019 also were periods of especially high tornado activity.

Tornado outbreak sequences tend to dominate the tornado statistics for a year and often cause a spike in tornado numbers for the entire year. Not all periods of active tornado occurrences are outbreak sequences, there must be no break in the activity to satisfy the definition. Active periods occur ranging from every year to every several years whereas continuously active periods are less common and can be rare depending on the parameters applied to define a sequence. By the late 2010s, medium to long range forecasting advanced sufficiently that some periods of high tornado activity can be somewhat reliably predicted several days to several weeks in advance.

See also 
 List of tornadoes and tornado outbreaks

References

Further reading 
 

Tornado

fr:Éruption de tornades#Longue séquence